Zel'dovich mechanism is a chemical mechanism that describes the oxidation of nitrogen and NOx formation, first proposed by the Russian physicist Yakov Borisovich Zel'dovich in 1946. The reaction mechanisms read as

{N2} + O <->[k_1] {NO} + {N},
{N} + O2 <->[k_2] {NO} + {O},

The overall global reaction is given by

 {N2} + {O2} <->[k] 2NO.

The overall reaction rate is mostly governed by the first reaction (i.e., rate-determining reaction), since the second reaction is much faster than the first reaction and occurs immediately following the first reaction. At fuel-rich conditions, due to lack of oxygen, reaction 2 becomes weak, hence, a third reaction is included in the mechanism, also known as extended Zel'dovich mechanism (with all three reactions),

{N} + {OH} <->[k_3] {NO} + {H}.

The forward rate constants of the reactions are given by

where the pre-exponential factor is measured in units of cm, mol, s and K, temperature in kelvins, and the activation energy in cal/mol; R is the universal gas constant.

NO formation
The rate of NO concentration increase is given by

N formation
Similarly, the rate of N concentration increase is

References

Combustion
Reaction mechanisms
Chemical reactions
Chemical kinetics
Pollutants